Draganovtsi is a village in Gabrovo Municipality, in Gabrovo Province, in northern central Bulgaria with around 400 inhabitans.

References

Villages in Gabrovo Province